DISGRACELAND is an American true crime music podcast written and hosted by Jake Brennan. It is produced by Double Elvis Productions. The podcast was adapted into a book written by Brennan entitled "DISGRACELAND: Musicians Getting Away with Murder and Behaving Very Badly" published by Grand Central Publishing in 2019.

Reception
Complex named the series one of the "Best Music Podcasts". Cosmopolitan named the series one of its "25 best podcasts of 2018" in December 2018. Hot Press also selected the series as one of its top podcasts for 2020.

Accolades 
 Winner of the 2019 iHeart Music Best Music Podcast
 Winner of the 2021 Webby for Best Music Podcast

References 

2018 podcast debuts
True crime
Audio podcasts
Crime podcasts